Daniel Meirion Walker (born 19 March 1977) is an English journalist, newsreader and television presenter. He currently presents 5 News on Channel 5.

He was the host of Football Focus from 2009 to 2021, as well as BBC Breakfast from 2016 until May 2022. He also presented shows on BBC Radio 5 Live and presented Sportsday on the BBC News Channel and BBC World News, as well as regularly reporting for Final Score and Match of the Day.

Early life
Daniel Meirion Walker was born on 19 March 1977 in Crawley, Sussex, to a Welsh mother. He lived in Crawley until the age of 18, where he attended Ifield Primary School, Three Bridges Middle School, and Hazelwick Secondary School. He earned a BA (Hons) degree in History in 1998 and an MA degree in Journalism Studies in 1999 at the University of Sheffield.

Career

Radio
Walker's professional broadcasting career started with work experience at Sheffield's Hallam FM. He gained the work experience after winning a competition for young sports commentators. In 1999, Walker moved to a full-time career with a four-year stint as a sports presenter and commentator for Manchester's Key 103. In his time at the station he presented the regular midweek sports show (often broadcasting from UEFA Champions League matches at Manchester United's Old Trafford ground) and also appeared as the resident sports correspondent for Mike Toolan's breakfast show.

Television
Walker moved into television with a six-month spell at Granada Television in Manchester, appearing as a commentator on the Football League Review show before joining BBC regional news programme North West Tonight. During this time, he was nominated for a number of awards and won the Royal Television Society Sports Award in 2005 for Regional Sports Presenter of the Year. He was unable to attend the ceremony because he was covering the Champions League final in Istanbul.

In 2006, Walker started working in London and in 2008 started presenting and reporting at Wimbledon, The Open, Aintree, Ascot and The Derby at Epsom as well as the Six Nations.

In August 2009, Walker took over from Manish Bhasin as the presenter of Football Focus.

Walker was part of the BBC Sport team covering the 2010 FIFA World Cup. He spent the tournament travelling from Cape Town at the start of the tournament to Johannesburg for the final in a double-decker bus, filming packages to be shown both as part of the TV coverage and online, and providing commentary and news via the BBC's online channels and Twitter.

On 26 November 2011, Gary Speed appeared as a guest on Football Focus with Walker. The two men spent a total of about four hours with each other on the day. Walker said of Speed: "I always found him to be kind, funny, intelligent and insightful. I found him to be a top bloke and really enjoyed his company." The following morning on Sunday 27 November 2011, Walker received the news that Speed had died by hanging at his house in Cheshire. Walker said that he was "stunned" by Speed's death and that he was "incredibly saddened". He had known Speed for quite a long time and had played football with him in a charity match two months earlier. In March 2012, Walker said that he was "staggered by the depth of feeling and shock" on the Sunday when Speed's death was announced.

In addition to Walker's TV work, he presented Afternoon Edition every Monday-Thursday on BBC Radio 5 Live until 2016, and has previously hosted shows on the station's evening sports output.

In 2016, Walker replaced Bill Turnbull as presenter of BBC Breakfast. His first show aired on 29 February and he presented the programme from Monday to Wednesday with Louise Minchin until mid-2021, and with Sally Nugent from late 2021 onwards. Walker presented the 'Clash of the Titans' segment of the Sport Relief telethon. He also reported for the 2016 Olympics.

In January 2019, Walker had a chance meeting with Tony Foulds, in Endcliffe Park, Sheffield, where Foulds was voluntarily maintaining the "Mi Amigo" memorial. Foulds, then aged eight, was in Endcliffe Park when a USAAF Boeing B-17 Flying Fortress bomber crashed in the park in February 1944; the crash killed all ten men on board. The pilot apparently tried to avoid Foulds and his friends. After the meeting, Walker started a campaign on social media to organise a flypast at the park. The campaign was successful, and the flypast took place on 22 February 2019, the 75th anniversary of the crash. The event was broadcast nationally and thousands of people, including the families of the airmen involved in the crash, attended the flypast.

In November 2020, Walker was confirmed as the new host of The NFL Show following previous host Mark Chapman's decision to step down.

Walker left Football Focus after 12 years on 22 May 2021; he continued as a presenter on BBC Breakfast and BBC Sport.

On 10 August 2021, it was announced he would be competing in the nineteenth series of Strictly Come Dancing. He was paired with the Ukrainian-Slovenian professional Nadiya Bychkova. They were eliminated in week 11.

In September 2021, Walker led tributes to his co-presenter Louise Minchin who left BBC Breakfast after 20 years of working on the programme.

On 4 April 2022, Walker announced, via a Twitter video, that he would be leaving the BBC to move to Channel 5. On 6 June 2022, Walker made his Channel 5 news debut, reporting live from 10 Downing Street when prime minister Boris Johnson survived a no confidence vote.

In December 2022, Walker won an episode of the quiz show The Weakest Link.

In February 2023, Walker interviewed Paul Ansell, partner of Nicola Bulley, for Channel 5 programme called 'Vanished - where is Nicola Bulley'. The interview was done in the interim period between her disappearing on January 27th, and her body being found 23 days later and then subsequently identified. It aired on Channel 5 on 10th February, and was deleted from the Channel 5 app after her body was found. Walker was a friend of Emma White, who was a close friend of Nicola, and Emma appeared in several TV interviews about Nicola's disappearance. The interview was conducted in Emma White's property - Marsh Farm Hall Rooms, on the outskirts of Great Eccleston, which is hired out commercially for events.

Charity work
Walker is an active patron of several charities including the Sheffield Children's Hospital charity, alongside Jessica Ennis-Hill, Michael Vaughan and Lee Westwood.
Walker climbed Mount Kilimanjaro for Comic Relief with a number of other celebrities in 2019.

Personal life
Walker lives in Sheffield. He has been married to Sarah since 2001. The couple met at Sheffield University and they have three children, two daughters and a son. He supports Crawley Town Football Club.

He is a practising Christian who has maintained his position not to work on Sunday throughout his career, although he comments on twitter on Sundays. 

In February 2023, Walker was taken to hospital after being in a collision with a car while cycling in Sheffield. He later said that wearing a helmet saved his life.

Books
 Dan Walker's Football Thronkersaurus: Football's Finest Tales (Simon & Schuster, 2014) 
 Magic, Mud and Maradona: Cup Football's Finest Tales (Simon & Schuster, 2016) 
 Remarkable People: Extraordinary Stories of Everyday Lives (Headline, 2021) 
 Standing on the Shoulders: Incredible Heroes and How They Inspire Us (Headline, 2022)

References

External links
 
 Dan Walker profile, Day One Magazine (2008)
 Dan Walker profile, Grace Magazine (2002)
 Dan Walker TV Newsroom Questions and Answers 2006
 Afternoon Edition
 Dan Walker website by Internet Dreams Studio
 Sheffield Chamber of Commerce website, Dan Walker hosted 2018

People educated at Hazelwick School
Alumni of the University of Sheffield
BBC newsreaders and journalists
BBC North West newsreaders and journalists
BBC sports presenters and reporters
Christian Young Earth creationists
English Christians
English people of Welsh descent
English sports journalists
English television presenters
Living people
People from Crawley
1977 births